Óscar Sebastián García Carmona (born August 2, 1993, in San Nicolás de los Garza, Mexico) is a Mexican former professional footballer.

External links
 
 

1993 births
Living people
Association football defenders
C.F. Monterrey players
Correcaminos UAT footballers
Liga MX players
Ascenso MX players
Liga Premier de México players
Tercera División de México players
Footballers from Nuevo León
People from San Nicolás de los Garza
Mexican footballers